Giannis Papanikolaou (born 18 November 1998) is a Greek professional footballer who plays as a midfielder for Ekstraklasa club Raków Częstochowa and the Greece national team.

Club career

Platanias
On 23 April 2017, Papanikolaou made his official debut in a 3–1 home loss against PAOK. On 5 November 2017, he scored his first professional goal in a 5–1 away loss against Olympiacos.

Panionios
On 11 June 2019, Panionios officially announced the signing of Papanikolaou on a free transfer. The young winger, who made 31 appearances during the 2018–19 season, scoring four goals and giving five assists, joined the club, following his refusal to renew his contract with Platanias.

Raków Częstochowa 
On 11 August 2020, Papanikolaou joined Polish Ekstraklasa club Raków Częstochowa, on a contract until the end of June 2021, and an available option of a four-years extension of the contract. On 8 February 2021, the club announced they have made use of the option and have extended his contract until the end of June 2025. On 12 February 2022, he opened the score with a kick in the left corner in an away 1–0 win game against Radomiak Radom in the 20th second of the game. It was his first goal with the club in all competitions.

International career
Papanikolaou was called up by the senior Greece side for the 2022–23 UEFA Nations League matches against Northern Ireland on 2 June 2022, against Kosovo on 5 June 2022 and 12 June 2022 and against Cyprus on 9 June 2022.

Career statistics

Club

Honours
Raków Częstochowa
Polish Cup: 2020–21, 2021–22
Polish Super Cup: 2021, 2022

References

External links 

1998 births
Living people
Footballers from Athens
Greek footballers
Association football midfielders
Greece international footballers
Greece youth international footballers
Greece under-21 international footballers
Greek expatriate footballers
Super League Greece players
Ekstraklasa players
Platanias F.C. players
Panionios F.C. players
Raków Częstochowa players
Expatriate footballers in Poland
Greek expatriate sportspeople in Poland